John Ellsworth Weis (1892–1962) was an American painter.

Biography
He was born in Powell County, Kentucky, moved to Higginsport, Ohio at an early age, and then moved again to Norwood, Ohio, at nine years of age. At 14 years of age, he enrolled in night classes at the Art Academy of Cincinnati, the faculty of which included Frank Duveneck (1848–1919), James Roy Hopkins (1877–1969), Lewis Henry Meakin (1850–1917), and Herman Henry Wessel (1878–1969). Weis eventually became a full-time student, and at age 22, joined the faculty. He remained on the faculty for 38 years, with the exception of a period of military service during World War I.

In the 1920s Weis traveled to Europe, where he exhibited at the Paris Salon. He was accompanied by his student, Frank Harmon Myers (1899–1956) on this trip. After returning to Cincinnati, Weis married Sally Cuthbert, a student at the Art Academy of Cincinnati who became an instructor at the University of Cincinnati College of Design, Architecture, Art, and Planning. Parkinson's disease forced him to retire from the Art Academy in 1957, and he died from a fall in his home in 1962.

Weis is best known for his impressionistic landscapes (as typified by The Canal at Dusk) and portraits (as typified by An Afro-American with Hat). He exhibited at the Pennsylvania Academy of the Fine Arts Annual in 1925, 1926, 1927, 1930, and 1933; at the Art Institute of Chicago in 1926, 1928, and 1930; and at the Corcoran Gallery biennials in 1928 and 1932.

He died in 1962.

Auction record
The auction record for a painting by John Ellsworth Weis is $3,105. This record was set by The Canal at Dusk, a 12 by 17 inch oil painting on canvas sold January 7, 2007.

References
 Bernard, Allen W., An Exhibition of Paintings by John Ellsworth Weis (1892-1962), Cincinnati, Mary Leonhard Ran, 1986.
 Falk, Peter Hastings, Who was Who in American Art, 1564-1975, Madison, CT, Sound View Press, 1999, Vol. III, p. 3724.
 Fielding, Mantle, Dictionary of American Painters, Sculptors & Engravers, Poughkeepsie, N.Y., Apollo, 1986, p. 1081.

Footnotes

External links
Artwork by John Ellsworth Weis

20th-century American painters
American male painters
1892 births
1962 deaths
Artists from Cincinnati
People from Powell County, Kentucky
Accidental deaths from falls
Art Academy of Cincinnati alumni
Art Academy of Cincinnati faculty
People from Norwood, Ohio
People from Brown County, Ohio
20th-century American male artists